Jay Lawrence (born Jay Storch; April 24, 1924June 18, 1987) was an American stand-up comedian, TV and film actor and voice over actor, and the younger brother of stand-up comedian and television sitcom/voice over actor Larry Storch.

Early life

Lawrence was born in New York City to Alfred Storch, a realtor, and his wife, Sally (née Kupperman) Storch, a telephone operator. He and his brother Larry attended the same school as comedian and actor Don Adams, who remained lifelong friends with him and Storch.

Career

Lawrence first got his start in show business alongside his more famous brother Larry as a stand-up comic in New York City in the 1940 while in his teens. A well in-demand television actor in Hollywood, Lawrence's acting career spanned from 1950 to 1979, and he appeared in dramatic, variety show and sitcom projects such as The Colgate Comedy Hour (1950), the original TV Dragnet program in 2 appearances in 1955 and 1959, Get Smart (1968), and Mayberry R.F.D. (1968). In the early 1960s, he fronted for and performed at a then-popular New York nightclub (The Crystal Room) on East 54th Street in Manhattan.

Film and voice over projects
In addition to his work in television, Lawrence also appeared in nine film projects, also lending his voice to the 1974 adult-themed animated feature-length project The Nine Lives of Fritz the Cat. He also appeared as a voice actor on the ABC-TV animated Saturday morning cartoon Hong Kong Phooey (1976). Also as a film actor, Jay Lawrence performed in movies such as The Big Chase (1954), in which he portrayed Jim Bellows, Train Ride to Hollywood (1975), and The Halliday Brand (1957), and a prominent supporting role as Sgt. Bagradian who gave brilliant, dead-on impressions of leading film actors in the critically acclaimed Billy Wilder directed war/German POW prison camp dramedy Stalag 17 (1953). He was alongside actor William Holden, who won an Oscar for his role for Best Actor in a drama film.

Death

Lawrence died on June 18, 1987, in Los Angeles. He is interred at the Italian Cemetery in Colma, California.

Filmography

References

External links

Male actors from New York City
1924 births
1987 deaths
American male television actors
American male film actors
Jewish American male actors
Jewish American comedians
Radio personalities from Cleveland
20th-century American male actors
Jewish American male comedians
20th-century American Jews